Terror Toons is a 2002 American comedy horror film directed by Joe Castro and written by Rudy Balli, starring Lizzy Borden, Beverly Lynne, Brandon Ellison, Kerry Liu, and Fernando Padilla. The film was followed by three sequels, Terror Toons 2: The Sick and Silly Show in 2007, Terror Toons 3 in 2016, and Terror Toons 4 in 2021.

Plot 
In the "Cartoon Dimension", mad scientist Doctor Carnage experiments on a man, then disembowels him and rips his skull out through his stomach. On Earth, sisters Cindy and Candy are left alone with Cindy's friend Amy. While Cindy and Amy call over Rick and Eddie, Candy watches a Terror Toons DVD that she received in the mail. Created by Satan, the DVD depicts the antics of Doctor Carnage and his accomplice Max Assassin, a stolen lab monkey that was mutated into a monster gorilla by Carnage.

As Cindy and her friends play Strip Ouija, Candy dozes off, awakening when Carnage and Max appear in her room. The two rip Candy's spine out, behead her friend Tommy when he drops by, dismember a pizza delivery man with a giant pizza cutter, and do a hypnotic disco dance number that causes Eddie to vomit up his own innards. When Cindy, Amy, and Rick try to escape, they discover that all of the doors have been replaced by vertigo-inducing spirals. Rick is taken and has his brain experimented on by Carnage and Max, while Cindy and Amy are separated when a police officer who was released from Terror Toons is blown up by a stick of dynamite that was hidden in a box of donuts.

Cindy is captured by Carnage and, along with the lobotomized Rick, is forced to watch as Carnage and Max saw Amy in half as a part of a magic act. The two villains then take Cindy to a cartoon version of Hell and present her to the Devil, who explains that he intends to use Terror Toons to ravage the Earth and corrupt children. Realizing that "anything is possible" in cartoons, Cindy becomes a superheroine and challenges the Devil, who sends her back to her house. After discovering a machine that is producing Terror Toons DVDs, Cindy is attacked by Max, but she uses her new powers to snap his neck and stomp his brain out. When Carnage comes at her with a giant axe, Cindy uses it against him, cutting his head in half with it. As tiny monsters pour out of Carnage's split skull, Cindy destroys the Terror Toons DVD press with a crowbar.

Cindy and Candy's parents return home from a wedding and find Rick banging his head against a wall while Cindy laughs hysterically, surrounded by the remains of her friends and sister. Next door, a boy finds another copy of Terror Toons in his mailbox, and rushes inside with it. The boy's front door slams shut, and Carnage's giggle is heard.

Cast 

 Beverly Lynne as Cindy
 Lizzy Borden as Candy
 Brandon Ellison as Rick
 Kerry Liu as Amy
 Fernando Padilla as Eddie
 Jack Roberts as The Devil
 Gil Chase as The Father
 Shimmy Maxx as The Mother
 Fernando Gasca as Tommy
 Alexi Bustamante as The Pizza Boy
 James Sullivan as The Cartoon Cop
 Stephanie Vasquez as Cartoon Girl #1
 Diane Heppner as Cartoon Girl #2
 Scott Barrow as Max Assassin
 Matt Falletta as Doctor Carnage
 Ian Villalobos as The Neighbor's Son

Production 

Terror Toons was shot in three days on a budget of $2,300. This film was also the non-pornographic debut of adult film stars Lizzy Borden and Beverly Lynne.

Reception 

G. Noel Gross of DVD Talk gave Terror Toons a 4/5, calling it "remarkably witty" and writing, "the whole thing bobs along like a drug-induced hallucination on a river of good old fashion GORE backed by a circus calliope soundtrack. Mr. Lewis will be proud". Conversely, Ben Platt of Something Awful referred to the film as "a shitheap" and gave it a score of -48 out -50. Similarly, Jo Hadeed, youth correspondent for The Free Lance–Star, dismissed Terror Toons as "filth" comparable to Killer Klowns from Outer Space. The film was also covered by Robert Fure for Film School Rejects's "Worst Movie Ever" column, which described Terror Toons as "quite possibly the single worst movie ever made".

See also 

 Evil Toons, a similar film released in 1992.

References

External links 

 

2002 films
American monster movies
2000s monster movies
American splatter films
2000s teen films
Films about apes
Mad scientist films
Teen superhero films
Films about siblings
The Devil in film
2000s English-language films
Films about television
Mass murder in fiction
Films about size change
Hell in popular culture
American superhero films
2002 comedy horror films
2000s superhero films
American supernatural horror films
2002 direct-to-video films
American independent films
American teen horror films
American comedy horror films
Direct-to-video comedy films
Direct-to-video horror films
Films directed by Joe Castro
Films about parallel universes
American direct-to-video films
American films with live action and animation
Films shot in Los Angeles
Experimental medical treatments in fiction
Films about animation
American satirical films
Superhero horror films
2000s American films